In basketball (and derivatives like netball), a player may attempt to score a basket by leaping straight into the air, the elbow of the shooting hand cocked, ball in hand above the head, and lancing the ball in a high arc towards the basket for a jump shot (colloquially, a jumper).  Although early critics thought the leap might lead to indecision in the air, the jump shot replaced the earlier, less quickly released set shot, and eventually transformed the game because it is the easiest shot to make from a distance and more difficult for a defender to block. Variations on the simple jump shot include the "turnaround jumper" (facing away from the basket, then jumping and spinning towards it, shooting the ball in mid-air); the "fadeaway" (jumping away from the basket to create space); and the "leaning jumper" (jumping towards the basket to move away from a trailing defender). With the "hook shot," a player is turned sideways with the shooting arm away from the basket outstretched so that with a sweep he can launch the ball over his head. Since a defender must leap to block a jumper, the shooter may use a pump fake to get the defender in the air at the wrong time and so have a clear shot. If the shooter leaps into the defender, a foul is called on the defensive player, whereas the shooter is awarded two or three free throws according to the value of a missed attempt, or a single free throw. 

Debate still continues as to who invented the jump shot. In the NCAA collegiate archives, John Miller Cooper, who played at the University of Missouri in the 1930s, is recognized as the person to hoist the first jump shot. However, John Christgau, in The Origins of the Jump Shot, makes a strong case that Ken Sailors did so in May 1934. Sailors went on to play for the University of Wyoming and was selected as MVP of their 1943 NCAA Championship team. Sailors also played for five different teams in the old American Basketball League. Other people that Christgau credits with the jump shot are Glen "Glenn" Roberts, Myer "Whitey" Skoog, John "Mouse" Gonzales, Bud Palmer, Davage "Dave" Minor, “Jumping” Joe Fulks, Johnny Adams, and Belus Smawley. Hank Luisetti is credited with popularizing the jump shot. Paul Arizin popularized the running jump shot.

Further reading

References

External links

BBC Sport: The jump shot
How To Shoot a Basketball Guide

Basketball terminology
Basketball strategy
Jumping